Table Mountain is located in Ulster County, New York. 
The mountain is part of the Catskill Mountains.
Table Mountain is flanked to the south by Peekamoose Mountain, and to the northeast by Lone Mountain.

The east end of Table Mountain drains into Rondout Creek, thence into the Hudson River, and into New York Bay. 
The south side of Table Mtn. drains into Bear Hole Brook, thence into Rondout Creek. 
The west end of Table Mtn. drains into Tray Mill Brook, thence into the East Branch of the Neversink River, the Delaware River, and into Delaware Bay. 
The north side of Table Mtn. drains into Donovan Brook, thence into the East Branch of the Neversink.

Table Mountain is within the Slide Mountain Wilderness of New York's Catskill State Park. 

See also 
 List of mountains in New York

Notes

External links 
 
  Catskill 3500 Club: Table Mountain
 

Catskill High Peaks
Mountains of Ulster County, New York
Mountains of New York (state)